Mira Furlan (7 September 1955 – 20 January 2021) was a Croatian actress and singer. Internationally, she was best known for her roles as the Minbari Ambassador Delenn in the science fiction television series Babylon 5 (1993–1998), and as Danielle Rousseau in Lost (2004–2010), and also appeared in multiple award-winning films such as When Father Was Away on Business (1985) and The Abandoned (2010).

Early life
Furlan was born on 7 September 1955 to an intellectual and academic family that included a large number of university professors in Zagreb, PR Croatia, which was part of Yugoslavia at the time. She was born to Branka Weil, a mother who was of Bosnian-Jewish and Bosnian-Serb descent, and Ivan Furlan, a father of mixed Slovene-Croat descent.

As a child, Furlan was obsessed with American rock and roll music. She became interested in acting as a teenager.

Furlan graduated from the Academy for Dramatic Arts in Zagreb with Bachelor of Fine Arts in theatre. Simultaneously, she took language classes at the university's Faculty of Humanities and Social Sciences, becoming fluent in English, German, and French.

Career

Acting
Furlan was a member of the Croatian National Theatre in Zagreb and frequently appeared in Yugoslav television and films. She played Ankica Vidmar in the film When Father Was Away on Business, which won the Palme d'Or at the 1985 Cannes Film Festival and was nominated for the Academy Award for Best Foreign Language Film. In the late 1980s, she performed in theater productions in both Zagreb and Belgrade.

Furlan became a member of the Actors Studio in 1992 after moving to New York City to flee turmoil in Yugoslavia. Later that year, her theater contacts in the U.S. helped her get the necessary work permits to perform with the Indiana Repertory Theatre as the lead role in Yerma.

She appeared on the stage in New York City and Los Angeles. She played the central ensemble role of Minbari Ambassador Delenn for all five seasons of Babylon 5, and some of the associated TV movies. Between 2004 and 2010 she played the recurring role of Danielle Rousseau on Lost. In 2009, she appeared on an episode of NCIS, titled "South By Southwest".

In 2002, she returned to Croatia after eleven years to take the lead role in Rade Šerbedžija's Ulysses Theatre Company's production of Euripides' Medea.

Singing
In the 1980s, Furlan briefly appeared as singer for Le Cinema, a spin-off from the rock band Film. In 1998, she released an album, Songs From Movies That Have Never Been Made.

Furlan also sang in the band The be five, which produced a single album in 1998, Trying to forget.

Writing
Furlan wrote the play Until Death Do Us Part, which is set in 1970s Zagreb. A collection of her columns in the now-defunct Croatian magazine Feral Tribune was published as the book Totalna rasprodaja in 2010.

Personal life
Furlan's husband was director Goran Gajić, who is an ethnic Serb. He directed her in an episode of Babylon 5 and in several plays, including a production of Sophocles' Antigone.

Furlan was active in the Yugoslav feminist movement in the 1980s.

Twice a month during the late 1980s, Furlan made the three-hour commute between Zagreb and Belgrade, where her husband was based, to act in theater productions in both cities. After the Croatian War of Independence began in 1991, she was fired by the Croatian National Theater for refusing to quit acting in a Belgrade theater production. An ensuing public smear campaign turned her colleagues and friends against her as she received threatening messages on her answering machine. Furlan wrote a public letter expressing her deep disappointment over the behaviour of her fellow citizens and colleagues and the threats of the nationalists against her. The couple left in November 1991, in the early days of the breakup of Yugoslavia, emigrating to New York City.

Furlan gave birth to the couple's only child, Marko Lav, in 1998.

Illness and death
Furlan died at her home in Los Angeles on January 20, 2021, at the age of 65, having suffered from complications of West Nile fever in the time leading up to her death. Upon her death, theater director Ivica Buljan of the Croatian National Theater issued an apology on behalf of the theater for their treatment of Furlan in the early 1990s. A week later, Croatian weekly Globus issued another apology for publishing three feuilletons attacking the actress in 1992 that had an essential role in the public smear campaign.

Awards
 1982 Pula Film Festival Golden Arena award for Best Supporting Actress in the film Cyclops.
 1986 Pula Film Festival Golden Arena award for Best Actress in The Beauty of Vice.
 1990 
 2013 Balkan New Film Festival Jury Award for Best Actress in The Abandoned.

Selected filmography

References

External links
 
 

1955 births
2021 deaths
Actors Studio alumni
Actresses from Zagreb
Croatian film actresses
Croatian people of Slovenian descent
Croatian stage actresses
Croatian television actresses
Golden Arena winners
Infectious disease deaths in California
Jewish Croatian actresses
Yugoslav emigrants to the United States
Yugoslav Jews
American people of Croatian descent
American people of Slovenian descent
American people of Croatian-Jewish descent
American Jews